Gaalivaana is an Indian Telugu-language mystery crime-thriller web series directed by Sharan Koppisetty with the story adapted and written by Chandra Pemmaraju. Produced by BBC Studios in association with Northstar Entertainment, the series has an ensemble cast of Raadhika Sarathkumar, Sai Kumar, Chandini Chowdary, Nandini Rai, Chaitanya Krishna, Thagubothu Ramesh, Sharanya Pradeep and Ashritha Vemuganti.

Based on BBC's original series One of Us, it premiered on 14 April 2022 on ZEE5. The series was simultaneously dubbed and released in Tamil as Kaarmegam.

Synopsis 
Ajay Varma and Geetha are childhood sweethearts, recently married and have just returned from their honeymoon. They are full of hope for the future-until their young lives are cut short by their brutal murder. Their two families, once split by old rifts, are now forced together in rage and grief. When the man who killed Ajay and Geetha crashes back into their lives, they face a choice that will have dark consequences for all of them. As they stumble down the dangerous path they've chosen, their journey twists and turns towards its devastating end.

Cast 

 Raadhika Sarathkumar as Saraswathi, Ajay Varma, Shravani, and Marthand's mother
 Sai Kumar as Komarraju, Geetha's father
 Chandini Chowdary as Shravani
 Chaitanya Krishna as Marthand
 Ashrita Vemuganti as Tulasi
 Yashna Chowdary as Young Tulasi
 Nandini Rai as IPS Nandini
 Thagubothu Ramesh as Anjaneyulu
 Sharanya Pradeep as Jyothi
 Armaan as Srikanth
 Charith as Ajay Varma
 Nikhitha Shree as Geetha
 Nanaji Karri as Patamata Srinu
 Sri Lakshmi  as Shakuntala
 Satish Saripalli as Satyanaryana
 Surabhi Jaya Chandra as Suribabu
 Keshav Deepak as Ravindra Varma
 Karthik as Young Ravindra Varma
 Naveen Sanaka as David Varma
 Surya Srinivas as Dev
 Arun as Arjun Naidu
 Rohini Naidu as Latha

Episodes

Production 
In December 2021, Telangana Today reported that P. Sai Kumar is making his debut in web series. The makers told the media house that "We have already started the shoot of the web series. It’s the first time that a European show has been adapted into Telugu. Suitable changes have been made to the original to suit the Telugu nativity,” said the makers. BBC is entering the regional market with the show." The final schedule of filming the series began in Gachibowli, Hyderabad in January 2022 and ended in February 2022.

Reception 
Thadhagath Pathi of The Times of India gave a rating of 2.5 out of 5 and praised the performance of lead actors P. Sai Kumar and Raadhika Sarathkumar. Pinkvilla stated that it is "fairly gripping thriller that comes with a shocking twist" and also praised performances of lead actors. Echoing the same, a reviewer of Sakshi felt that mid episodes of the series were slow-paced but worked well. 123Telugu gave a rating of 3 out of 5 and wrote that "On the whole, Gaalivaana is a decent crime thriller that offers stellar performances by Sai Kumar, Radhika Sarathkumar and a couple of other actors. Some scenes in a couple of episodes make you press the forward button. Especially, the climax portion could have been written well to make the series a great thriller."

Nelki Naresh of Hindustan Times appreciated the performances and writing.

References

External links 
 Gaalivaana on ZEE5

Telugu-language web series
2022 web series debuts
ZEE5 original programming
Crime web series
Indian thriller television series
Indian crime television series